Ledoux or LeDoux is a surname, and may refer to:

 Claude Nicolas Ledoux (1736–1806), French architect.
 Abraham Ledoux (1784-1842) and Antoine Ledoux (1779 - 1849), two French brothers born in Québec, who became trappers and settled in Mora, New Mexico and Taos, New Mexico
 Claude Ledoux (composer) (born 1960), Belgian composer
 Gabrielle LeDoux (born 1948), American lawyer and politician
 Harold LeDoux (born 1926), American comic artist
 Joseph E. LeDoux (born 1949), American neuroscientist
 Michel Ledoux (born 1958), French mathematician
 Patrice Ledoux, French film producer
 Paul Ledoux (1914–1988), Belgian astronomer
 Chris LeDoux (1943–2005), American country music singer-songwriter
 Scott LeDoux (1949–2011), American boxer

Surnames from nicknames